Nina Viktorovna Baldycheva (also known as Baldychova, Fedorova, Baldycheva-Fedorova or Fyodorova; 18 July 1947 – 27 January 2019) was a Russian cross-country skier who competed from 1970 to 1980. She won three medals at the Winter Olympics with a gold in the 4 × 5 km relay (1976), a silver in the 4 × 5 km relay (1980), and a bronze in the 5 km (1976). In the relay in 1976, she injured her left hand in a fall at the start, but completed the race.

At the FIS Nordic World Ski Championships Fyodorova earned two gold (3 × 5 km relay: 1970, 4 × 5 km: 1974) and one bronze medals (5 km: 1970). Domestically she won one individual Soviet title, over 5 km in 1971, and eight relay titles (1969–73, 1975–76, 1979). After retiring from competitions she worked as a cross-country skiing coach in Saint Petersburg. In 1976 she was awarded the Order of the Badge of Honor.

Cross-country skiing results
All results are sourced from the International Ski Federation (FIS).

Olympic Games
 3 medals – (1 gold, 1 silver, 1 bronze)

World Championships
 3 medals – (2 gold, 1 bronze)

References

External links
 
 
 
 
 

1947 births
2019 deaths
Soviet female cross-country skiers
Olympic cross-country skiers of the Soviet Union
Olympic gold medalists for the Soviet Union
Olympic silver medalists for the Soviet Union
Olympic bronze medalists for the Soviet Union
Cross-country skiers at the 1972 Winter Olympics
Cross-country skiers at the 1976 Winter Olympics
Cross-country skiers at the 1980 Winter Olympics
Olympic medalists in cross-country skiing
FIS Nordic World Ski Championships medalists in cross-country skiing
Medalists at the 1976 Winter Olympics
Medalists at the 1980 Winter Olympics